The 1977 New York Jets season was the 18th season for the team and the 8th in the National Football League. It began with the team trying to improve upon its 3–11 record from 1976 under new head coach Walt Michaels and beginning the post-Joe Namath era. However, the Jets struggled and finished with a third consecutive 3–11 season. They won a major off the field court decision. As per the memorandum of understanding signed in late 1961 by team original owner (as the New York Titans) Harry Wismer, Shea Stadium’s co-tenants, the New York Mets, would have exclusive use of the stadium until they had completed their season. The Jets were, in most years, required to open the season with several road games, a problem made worse in 1969 and 1973 when the Mets had long playoff runs. Feeling that this arrangement was a disadvantage, the team announced in 1977 that they would play two home games a year during the month of September at the Giants’ new home in New Jersey, Giants Stadium. Litigation began between New York City and the Jets over the issue, and in the lawsuit’s settlement, the city agreed to allow the Jets to play two September home games a season at Shea beginning in 1978 for the remaining six years in the Jets' lease. In 1977, the Jets were to play one September game at Giants Stadium and an October 2 game at Shea. From 1967 through this season—a span of 11 seasons—the Jets did not play a home game at Shea Stadium in the month of September. As of 2017, the Jets are the first (and so far, only) team in NFL history to finish 3 straight seasons with only 3 wins. During the NFL's 16-game schedule from the  1978 season to the 2020 season, no team finished 3–13 three years in a row, and no team has yet to finish 3-14 three years in a row under the 17-game schedule used since the 2021 season.

Offseason

Draft

Personnel

Staff

Roster

Schedule

Game summaries

Week 1: at Houston Oilers

Week 2 vs. Colts

Week 3: vs. New England Patriots

Week 4: at Buffalo Bills

Week 5: at Miami Dolphins

Week 6: vs. Oakland Raiders

Week 9: vs. Seattle Seahawks

Week 11 vs. Steelers

Week 12: at New Orleans Saints

Week 13: vs. Buffalo Bills 
Joe Ferguson hit Bob Chandler with two touchdown passes as the Bills defeated the Jets 14-10 at Shea Stadium.
Pat Leahy opened the scoring, early in the 2nd quarter with a 25-yd Field goal. Richard Todd connected with Wesley Walker to put the Jets ahead with less than two minutes remaining in the final quarter, but Ferguson moved the Bills 92 yards, tossing the winning touchdown with 40 seconds left.

Week 14: at Philadelphia Eagles

Standings

References 

Bibliography

Ryczek, William J. (2009). Crash of the Titans: The Early Years of the New York Jets and the AFL (revised ed.). Jefferson, North Carolina: McFarland & Co. .
Chastain, Bill (2010). 100 Things Jets Fans Should Know & Do Before They Die. Chicago: Triumph Books. .

External links 
 1977 statistics

New York Jets seasons
New York Jets
New York Jets season
1970s in Queens